The 2020–21 Drexel Dragons men's basketball team represented Drexel University during the 2020–21 NCAA Division I men's basketball season. The Dragons, led by fifth-year head coach Zach Spiker, played their home games at the Daskalakis Athletic Center in Philadelphia, Pennsylvania as members of the Colonial Athletic Association.

In the 2020–21 season, the Dragons had many games postponed or cancelled due to the COVID-19 pandemic, and did not have fans in attendance for all home games.

They finished the season 12-8, 4-5 in CAA Play to finish in 6th place. They defeated Charleston, Northeastern, and Elon to be champions of the CAA tournament. They received the conference’s automatic bid to the NCAA tournament where they lost in the First Round to Illinois.

Previous season

The Dragons finished the 2019–20 season 14–19,  6–12 in CAA play to finish in 8th place. They lost to Hofstra in the CAA tournament quarterfinals.

Offseason
On 14 July, 2020, Drexel announced the addition of Michael-Hakim Jordan as an assistant coach.

Departures

Incoming transfers

2020 recruiting class

Class of 2021 early commitments

Preseason 
In a poll of the league coaches, media relations directors, and media members at the CAA's media day, Drexel was picked to finish in third place in the CAA.  Redshirt senior James Butler and Junior guard Camren Wynter were selected to the Preseason CAA All-Conference First Team.

Roster

Schedule and results
Sources

|-
!colspan=12 style=| Non-conference regular season
|-

|-
!colspan=12 style=| CAA regular season
|-

|-
!colspan=12 style=| CAA Tournament
|-

|-
!colspan=12 style=| NCAA tournament
|-

Awards
James Butler
CAA All-Tournament Team
CAA All-Conference Third Team
Preseason CAA All-Conference First Team
"Sweep" Award (team leader in blocks)

Matej Juric
Team Academic Award

Zach Walton
CAA All-Tournament Team

Camren Wynter
Lou Henson Award Finalist
CAA Tournament Most Outstanding Player
CAA All-Tournament Team
CAA All-Conference First Team
CAA Player of the Week (2)
Preseason CAA All-Conference First Team
Team Most Valuable Player

See also
 2020–21 Drexel Dragons women's basketball team

References

Drexel Dragons men's basketball seasons
Drexel
Drexel
Drexel
Drexel